Abhijit Vinayak Banerjee (born 21 February 1961) is an Indian-American economist who is currently the Ford Foundation International Professor of Economics at Massachusetts Institute of Technology. Banerjee shared the 2019 Nobel Memorial Prize in Economic Sciences with Esther Duflo and Michael Kremer "for their experimental approach to alleviating global poverty". He and Esther Duflo, who are married, are the sixth married couple to jointly win a Nobel Prize.

Early life and education
Abhijit Banerjee was born to a Bengali family in Mumbai. His father, Dipak Banerjee, was a professor of economics at Presidency College, Calcutta, and his mother Nirmala Banerjee (née Patankar), a professor of economics at the Centre for Studies in Social Sciences, Calcutta. His father, Dipak Banerjee, earned a PhD in economics from the London School of Economics.

He received his school education in South Point High School, a renowned educational institution in Calcutta. After his schooling, he took admission at Presidency College, then an affiliated college of the University of Calcutta and now an autonomous university, where he completed his BSc(H) degree in economics in 1981. Later, he completed his M.A. in economics at the Jawaharlal Nehru University (JNU), Delhi in 1983. While studying in JNU, he was arrested and imprisoned in Tihar Jail during a protest after students gheraoed the then Vice Chancellor PN Srivastava of the university. He was released on bail and charges were subsequently dropped against the students. Later, he went on to obtain a PhD from Harvard University in 1988. The subject of his doctoral thesis was "Essays in Information Economics."

Academic career
Banerjee is currently the Ford Foundation International Professor of Economics at the Massachusetts Institute of Technology; he has taught at Harvard University and Princeton University. He has also been a Guggenheim Fellow and an Alfred P. Sloan Fellow. 

His work focuses on development economics. Together with Esther Duflo he has discussed field experiments as an important methodology to discover causal relationships in economics.
He was elected a fellow of the American Academy of Arts and Sciences in 2004. He was also honored with the Infosys Prize 2009 in the social sciences category of economics. He is also the recipient of the inaugural Infosys Prize in the category of social sciences (economics). He also served on the Social Sciences jury for the Infosys Prize in 2018.
In 2012, he shared the Gerald Loeb Award Honorable Mention for Business Book with co-author Esther Duflo for their book Poor Economics. 

In 2013, he was named by the United Nations Secretary General Ban Ki-Moon to a panel of experts tasked with updating the Millennium Development Goals after 2015 (their expiration date).

In 2014, he received the Bernhard-Harms-Prize from the Kiel Institute for the World Economy.

In 2019, he delivered Export-Import Bank of India's 34th Commencement Day Annual Lecture on Redesigning Social Policy.

In 2019, he was awarded the Nobel Prize in Economics, together with Esther Duflo and Michael Kremer, for their work alleviating global poverty.

Research and work in India
Banerjee and his co-workers try to measure the effectiveness of actions (such as government programmes) in improving people's lives. For this, they use randomized controlled trials, similar to clinical trials in medical research. For example, although polio vaccination is freely available in India, many mothers were not bringing their children for the vaccination drives. Banerjee and Prof. Esther Duflo, also from MIT, tried an experiment in Rajasthan, where they gave a bag of pulses to mothers who vaccinated their children. Soon, the immunization rate went up in the region. In another experiment, they found that learning outcomes improved in schools that were provided with teaching assistants to help students with special needs.

Banerjee is a co-founder of Abdul Latif Jameel Poverty Action Lab (along with economists Esther Duflo and Sendhil Mullainathan). In India he serves on the academic advisory board of Plaksha University, a science and technology university established in 2010.

Personal life
Abhijit Banerjee was married to Dr. Arundhati Tuli Banerjee, a lecturer of literature at MIT. Abhijit and Arundhati had one son together and later divorced. Their son, born in 1991, died in an accident in 2016.

In 2015, Banerjee married his co-researcher, MIT professor Esther Duflo; they have two children. Banerjee was a joint supervisor of Duflo's PhD in economics at MIT in 1999. Duflo is also a Professor of Poverty Alleviation and Development Economics at MIT.

Publications

Books
 
 
 
 
 
 
 Banerjee, Abhijit Vinayak ( 2019 ). A Short History of Poverty Measurements. Juggernaut Books.

Awards 

Abhijit Banerjee was awarded the Nobel Memorial Prize in Economic Sciences in 2019 along with his two co-researchers Esther Duflo and Michael Kremer "for their experimental approach to alleviating global poverty".

The press release from the Royal Swedish Academy of Sciences noted: "Their experimental research methods now entirely dominate development economics."

The Nobel committee commented:
"Banerjee, Duflo and their co-authors concluded that students appeared to learn nothing from additional days at school. Neither did spending on textbooks seem to boost learning, even though the schools in Kenya lacked many essential inputs. Moreover, in the Indian context Banerjee and Duflo intended to study, many children appeared to learn little: in results from field tests in the city of Vadodara fewer than one in five third-grade students could correctly answer first-grade curriculum math test questions.

"In response to such findings, Banerjee, Duflo and co-authors argued that efforts to get more children into school must be complemented by reforms to improve school quality."

The Nobel Prize was a major recognition for their chosen field - Development Economics, and for the use of Randomised Controlled Trials. It evoked mixed emotions in India, where his success was celebrated with nationalistic fervour while approach and pro-poor focus were seen as a negation of India’s current government’s ideology as well as broader development discourse.

He was awarded the Doctor of Letters (Honoris Causa) by the University of Calcutta in January 2020.

Abhijit Banerjee and Esther Duflo received the Golden Plate Award of the American Academy of Achievement in September 2022.

See also
 Amartya Sen, economist and the first Indian to receive a Nobel prize in the field

References

External links
 Abhijit Banerjee's Home Page at MIT including his CV with comprehensive lists of awards and publications 
 Poverty Action Lab
 
  
 Publications at the National Bureau of Economic Research
  including the Prize Lecture 8 December 2019 Field experiments and the practice of economics

1961 births
Living people
American people of Bengali descent
American people of Marathi descent
20th-century Bengalis
21st-century Bengalis
Marathi people
People from Mumbai
People from Maharashtra
Presidency University, Kolkata alumni
University of Calcutta alumni
Jawaharlal Nehru University alumni
Harvard Graduate School of Arts and Sciences alumni
MIT School of Humanities, Arts, and Social Sciences faculty
20th-century Indian economists
21st-century Indian economists
21st-century American economists
Naturalized citizens of the United States
American economists
American writers
Fellows of the American Academy of Arts and Sciences
Indian emigrants to the United States
Indian microfinance people
Indian male writers
Writers from Kolkata
20th-century Indian non-fiction writers
Indian Nobel laureates
Indian political writers
American academics of Indian descent
American Nobel laureates
Nobel laureates in Economics
Indian economists